In mathematics, a parabola is a plane curve which is mirror-symmetrical and is approximately U-shaped. It fits several superficially different mathematical descriptions, which can all be proved to define exactly the same curves.

One description of a parabola involves a point (the focus) and a line (the directrix). The focus does not lie on the directrix. The parabola is the locus of points in that plane that are equidistant from both the directrix and the focus. Another description of a parabola is as a conic section, created from the intersection of a right circular conical surface and a plane parallel to another plane that is tangential to the conical surface.

The line perpendicular to the directrix and passing through the focus (that is, the line that splits the parabola through the middle) is called the "axis of symmetry". The point where the parabola intersects its axis of symmetry is called the "vertex" and is the point where the parabola is most sharply curved. The distance between the vertex and the focus, measured along the axis of symmetry, is the "focal length". The "latus rectum" is the chord of the parabola that is parallel to the directrix and passes through the focus. Parabolas can open up, down, left, right, or in some other arbitrary direction. Any parabola can be repositioned and rescaled to fit exactly on any other parabola—that is, all parabolas are geometrically similar.

Parabolas have the property that, if they are made of material that reflects light, then light that travels parallel to the axis of symmetry of a parabola and strikes its concave side is reflected to its focus, regardless of where on the parabola the reflection occurs. Conversely, light that originates from a point source at the focus is reflected into a parallel ("collimated") beam, leaving the parabola parallel to the axis of symmetry. The same effects occur with sound and other waves. This reflective property is the basis of many practical uses of parabolas.

The parabola has many important applications, from a parabolic antenna or parabolic microphone to automobile headlight reflectors and the design of ballistic missiles. It is frequently used in physics, engineering, and many other areas.

History 

The earliest known work on conic sections was by Menaechmus in the 4th century BC. He discovered a way to solve the problem of doubling the cube using parabolas. (The solution, however, does not meet the requirements of compass-and-straightedge construction.) The area enclosed by a parabola and a line segment, the so-called "parabola segment", was computed by Archimedes by the method of exhaustion in the 3rd century BC, in his The Quadrature of the Parabola. The name "parabola" is due to Apollonius, who discovered many properties of conic sections. It means "application", referring to "application of areas" concept, that has a connection with this curve, as Apollonius had proved. The focus–directrix property of the parabola and other conic sections is due to Pappus.

Galileo showed that the path of a projectile follows a parabola, a consequence of uniform acceleration due to gravity.

The idea that a parabolic reflector could produce an image was already well known before the invention of the reflecting telescope. Designs were proposed in the early to mid-17th century by many mathematicians, including René Descartes, Marin Mersenne, and James Gregory. When Isaac Newton built the first reflecting telescope in 1668, he skipped using a parabolic mirror because of the difficulty of fabrication, opting for a spherical mirror. Parabolic mirrors are used in most modern reflecting telescopes and in satellite dishes and radar receivers.

Definition as a locus of points 
A parabola can be defined geometrically as a set of points (locus of points) in the Euclidean plane:

 A parabola is a set of points, such that for any point  of the set the distance  to a fixed point , the focus, is equal to the distance  to a fixed line , the directrix:

 

The midpoint  of the perpendicular from the focus  onto the directrix  is called vertex, and the line  is the axis of symmetry of the parabola.

In a Cartesian coordinate system

Axis of symmetry parallel to the y axis 

If one introduces Cartesian coordinates, such that  and the directrix has the equation , one obtains for a point  from  the equation . Solving for  yields
 

This parabola is U-shaped (opening to the top).

The horizontal chord through the focus (see picture in opening section) is called the latus rectum; one half of it is the semi-latus rectum. The latus rectum is parallel to the directrix. The semi-latus rectum is designated by the letter . From the picture one obtains 
 

The latus rectum is defined similarly for the other two conics – the ellipse and the hyperbola. The latus rectum is the line drawn through a focus of a conic section parallel to the directrix and terminated both ways by the curve. For any case,  is the radius of the osculating circle at the vertex. For a parabola, the semi-latus rectum, is the distance of the focus from the directrix. Using the parameter , the equation of the parabola can be rewritten as

 

 

 Remarks
 In the case of  the parabola has a downward opening.
 The presumption that the axis is parallel to the y axis allows one to consider a parabola as the graph of a polynomial of degree 2, and conversely: the graph of an arbitrary polynomial of degree 2 is a parabola (see next section).
These parabolas open to the left (if ) or to the right (if ).

General position 

 

(the left side of the equation uses the Hesse normal form of a line to calculate the distance ).

For a parametric equation of a parabola in general position see .

The implicit equation of a parabola is defined by an irreducible polynomial of degree two:
 
such that  or, equivalently, such that  is the square of a linear polynomial.

As a graph of a function 

The previous section shows that any parabola with the origin as vertex and the y axis as axis of symmetry can be considered as the graph of a function
 

From the section above one obtains:
 the directrix has the equation ,
 the tangent at point  has the equation .

For  the parabola is the unit parabola with equation .

The general function of degree 2 is
 .
Completing the square yields
 
which is the equation of a parabola with
 the axis  (parallel to the y axis),
 the focal length , the semi-latus rectum ,
 the vertex ,
 the focus ,
 the directrix ,
 the point of the parabola intersecting the y axis has coordinates ,
 the tangent at a point on the y axis has the equation .

Similarity to the unit parabola 

Two objects in the Euclidean plane are similar if one can be transformed to the other by a similarity, that is, an arbitrary composition of rigid motions (translations and rotations) and uniform scalings.

A parabola  with vertex  can be transformed by the translation  to one with the origin as vertex. A suitable rotation around the origin can then transform the parabola to one that has the  axis as axis of symmetry. Hence the parabola  can be transformed by a rigid motion to a parabola with an equation . Such a parabola can then be transformed by the uniform scaling  into the unit parabola with equation . Thus, any parabola can be mapped to the unit parabola by a similarity.

A synthetic approach, using similar triangles, can also be used to establish this result.

The general result is that two conic sections (necessarily of the same type) are similar if and only if they have the same eccentricity. Therefore, only circles (all having eccentricity 0) share this property with parabolas (all having eccentricity 1), while general ellipses and hyperbolas do not.

But this mapping is not a similarity, and only shows that all parabolas are affinely equivalent (see ).

As a special conic section 

The pencil of conic sections with the x axis as axis of symmetry, one vertex at the origin (0, 0) and the same semi-latus rectum  can be represented by the equation 
 
with  the eccentricity.
 For  the conic is a circle (osculating circle of the pencil),
 for  an ellipse,
 for  the parabola with equation 
 for  a hyperbola (see picture).

In polar coordinates 

If , the parabola with equation  (opening to the right) has the polar representation

 
.

If one shifts the origin into the focus, that is, one obtains the equation

 

Remark 1: Inverting this polar form shows that a parabola is the inverse of a cardioid.

Remark 2: The second polar form is a special case of a pencil of conics with focus  (see picture):
  ( is the eccentricity).

Conic section and quadratic form

Diagram, description, and definitions 

The diagram represents a cone with its axis . The point A is its apex. An inclined cross-section of the cone, shown in pink, is inclined from the axis by the same angle , as the side of the cone. According to the definition of a parabola as a conic section, the boundary of this pink cross-section EPD is a parabola.

A cross-section perpendicular to the axis of the cone passes through the vertex P of the parabola. This cross-section is circular, but appears elliptical when viewed obliquely, as is shown in the diagram. We will call its radius .

Another perpendicular to the axis, circular cross-section of the cone is farther from the apex A than the one just described. It has a chord , which joins the points where the parabola intersects the circle. These two chords and the parabola's axis of symmetry  all intersect at the point M.

All the labelled points, except D and E, are coplanar. They are in the plane of symmetry of the whole figure. This includes the point F, which is not mentioned above.

Derivation of quadratic equation 

 (triangle BPM is isosceles, because ),
 (PMCK is a parallelogram).

 

Substituting:

 

Rearranging:

 

This last equation shows the relationship between these variables. They can be interpreted as Cartesian coordinates of the points D and E, in a system in the pink plane with P as its origin. Since  is squared in the equation, the fact that D and E are on opposite sides of the  axis is unimportant. The parabolic curve is therefore the locus of points where the equation is satisfied, which makes it a Cartesian graph of the quadratic function in the equation.

Focal length 

Position of the focus 
In the diagram above, the point V is the foot of the perpendicular from the vertex of the parabola to the axis of the cone. The point F is the foot of the perpendicular from the point V to the plane of the parabola. By symmetry, F is on the axis of symmetry of the parabola. It is shown above that this distance equals the focal length of the parabola, which is the distance from the vertex to the focus. The focus and the point F are therefore equally distant from the vertex, along the same line, which implies that they are the same point. Therefore, the point F, defined above, is the focus of the parabola.

This discussion started from the definition of a parabola as a conic section, but it has now led to a description as a graph of a quadratic function. This shows that these two descriptions are equivalent. They both define curves of exactly the same shape.

Alternative proof with Dandelin spheres 

An alternative proof can be done using Dandelin spheres. It works without calculation and uses elementary geometric considerations only (see the derivation below).

The intersection of an upright cone by a plane , whose inclination from vertical is the same as a generatrix (a.k.a. generator line, a line containing the apex and a point on the cone surface)  of the cone, is a parabola (red curve in the diagram).

This generatrix  is the only generatrix of the cone that is parallel to plane . Otherwise, if there are two generatrices parallel to the intersecting plane, the intersection curve will be a hyperbola (or degenerate hyperbola, if the two generatrices are in the intersecting plane). If there is no generatrix parallel to the intersecting plane, the intersection curve will be an ellipse or a circle (or a point).

Let plane  be the plane that contains the vertical axis of the cone and line . The inclination of plane  from vertical is the same as line  means that, viewing from the side (that is, the plane  is perpendicular to plane ), .

The plane containing the circle  intersects with plane  at line . There is a mirror symmetry in the system consisting of plane , Dandelin sphere  and the cone (the plane of symmetry is ). 

Since line  is in plane , .

 Let  be an arbitrary point of the intersection curve.
 The generatrix of the cone containing  intersects circle  at point .
 Generatrix  intersects the circle  at point .
Since , and point  is in plane , line  must be in plane . Since , we know that  as well.
 Let point  be the foot of the perpendicular from point  to line , that is,  is a segment of line , and hence .
 From intercept theorem and  we know that .

Proof of the reflective property 

The reflective property states that if a parabola can reflect light, then light that enters it travelling parallel to the axis of symmetry is reflected toward the focus. This is derived from geometrical optics, based on the assumption that light travels in rays. 

Consider the parabola . Since all parabolas are similar, this simple case represents all others.

Construction and definitions 
The point E is an arbitrary point on the parabola. The focus is F, the vertex is A (the origin), and the line   is the axis of symmetry. The line  is parallel to the axis of symmetry and intersects the  axis at D.  The point B is the midpoint of the line segment .

Deductions 
The vertex A is equidistant from the focus F and from the directrix. Since C is on the directrix, the  coordinates of F and C are equal in absolute value and opposite in sign. Its  coordinate is half that of D,  that is, . But  is also the slope (first derivative) of the parabola at E. Therefore, the line  is the tangent to the parabola at E.

(The angle above E is vertically opposite angle ∠BEC.) This means that a ray of light that enters the parabola and arrives at E travelling parallel to the axis of symmetry will be reflected by the line  so it travels along the line , as shown in red in the diagram (assuming that the lines can somehow reflect light). Since  is the tangent to the parabola at E, the same reflection will be done by an infinitesimal arc of the parabola at E. Therefore, light that enters the parabola and arrives at E travelling parallel to the axis of symmetry of the parabola is reflected by the parabola toward its focus.

This conclusion about reflected light applies to all points on the parabola, as is shown on the left side of the diagram. This is the reflective property.

Other consequences 
There are other theorems that can be deduced simply from the above argument.

Tangent bisection property 
The above proof and the accompanying diagram show that the tangent  bisects the angle ∠FEC. In other words, the tangent to the parabola at any point bisects the angle between the lines joining the point to the focus and perpendicularly to the directrix.

Intersection of a tangent and perpendicular from focus 

Since triangles △FBE and △CBE are congruent,  is perpendicular to the tangent . Since B is on the  axis, which is the tangent to the parabola at its vertex, it follows that the point of intersection between any tangent to a parabola and the perpendicular from the focus to that tangent lies on the line that is tangential to the parabola at its vertex. See animated diagram and pedal curve.

Reflection of light striking the convex side 
If light travels along the line , it moves parallel to the axis of symmetry and strikes the convex side of the parabola at E. It is clear from the above diagram that this light will be reflected directly away from the focus, along an extension of the segment .

Alternative proofs 

The above proofs of the reflective and tangent bisection properties use a line of calculus. Here a geometric proof is presented.

In this diagram, F is the focus of the parabola, and T and U lie on its directrix. P is an arbitrary point on the parabola.  is perpendicular to the directrix, and the line  bisects angle ∠FPT. Q is another point on the parabola, with  perpendicular to the directrix. We know that  =  and  = . Clearly,  > , so  > . Therefore,  is the tangent to the parabola at P. Since it bisects the angle ∠FPT, this proves the tangent bisection property.

The logic of the last paragraph can be applied to modify the above proof of the reflective property. It effectively proves the line  to be the tangent to the parabola at E if the angles  are equal. The reflective property follows as shown previously.

Pin and string construction 

The definition of a parabola by its focus and directrix can be used for drawing it with help of pins and strings:
 Choose the focus  and the directrix  of the parabola.
 Take a triangle of a set square and prepare a string with length  (see diagram).
 Pin one end of the string at point  of the triangle and the other one to the focus .
 Position the triangle such that the second edge of the right angle is free to slide along the directrix.
 Take a pen and hold the string tight to the triangle.

Properties related to Pascal's theorem 
The 5-, 4- and 3- point degenerations of Pascal's theorem are properties of a conic dealing with at least one tangent. If one considers this tangent as the line at infinity and its point of contact as the point at infinity of the y axis, one obtains three statements for a parabola.

The following properties of a parabola deal only with terms connect, intersect, parallel, which are invariants of similarities. So, it is sufficient to prove any property for the unit parabola with equation .

4-points property 

Any parabola can be described in a suitable coordinate system by an equation .

 Let  be four points of the parabola , and  the intersection of the secant line  with the line  and let  be the intersection of the secant line  with the line  (see picture). Then the secant line  is parallel to line . 

Proof: straightforward calculation for the unit parabola .

Remark: the 4-points property of a parabola is an affine version of the 5-point degeneration of Pascal's theorem.

3-points–1-tangent property 

Let  be three points of the parabola with equation  and  the intersection of the secant line  with the line  and  the intersection of the secant line  with the line  (see picture). Then the tangent at point  is parallel to the line .

Proof: can be performed for the unit parabola . A short calculation shows: line  has slope  which is the slope of the tangent at point .

Application: The 3-points-1-tangent-property of a parabola can be used for the construction of the tangent at point , while  are given.

Remark: The 3-points-1-tangent-property of a parabola is an affine version of the 4-point-degeneration of Pascal's theorem.

2-points–2-tangents property 

Let  be two points of the parabola with equation , and  the intersection of the tangent at point  with the line , and  the intersection of the tangent at point  with the line  (see picture). Then the secant  is parallel to the line .

Proof: straight forward calculation for the unit parabola .

Remark 1: The 2-points–2-tangents property of a parabola is an affine version of the 3-point degeneration of Pascal's theorem.

Remark 2: The 2-points–2-tangents property should not be confused with the following property of a parabola, which also deals with 2 points and 2 tangents, but is not related to Pascal's theorem.

Axis direction 

The statements above presume the knowledge of the axis direction of the parabola, in order to construct the points . The following property determines the points  by two given points and their tangents only, and the result is that the line  is parallel to the axis of the parabola.

Let
  be two points of the parabola , and  be their tangents;
  be the intersection of the tangents ,
  be the intersection of the parallel line to  through  with the parallel line to  through  (see picture).
Then the line  is parallel to the axis of the parabola and has the equation 

Proof: can be done (like the properties above) for the unit parabola .

Application: This property can be used to determine the direction of the axis of a parabola, if two points and their tangents are given. An alternative way is to determine the midpoints of two parallel chords, see section on parallel chords.

Remark: This property is an affine version of the theorem of two perspective triangles of a non-degenerate conic.

Steiner generation

Parabola 

Steiner established the following procedure for the construction of a non-degenerate conic (see Steiner conic):
 Given two pencils  of lines at two points  (all lines containing  and  respectively) and a projective but not perspective mapping  of  onto , the intersection points of corresponding lines form a non-degenerate projective conic section.

This procedure can be used for a simple construction of points on the parabola :
 Consider the pencil at the vertex  and the set of lines  that are parallel to the y axis.
 The line segment  is divided into n equally spaced segments, and this division is projected (in the direction ) onto the line segment  (see figure). This projection gives rise to a projective mapping  from pencil  onto the pencil .
 The intersection of the line  and the i-th parallel to the y axis is a point on the parabola.

Proof: straightforward calculation.

Remark: Steiner's generation is also available for ellipses and hyperbolas.

Dual parabola 

A dual parabola consists of the set of tangents of an ordinary parabola.

The Steiner generation of a conic can be applied to the generation of a dual conic by changing the meanings of points and lines:
 Let be given two point sets on two lines , and a projective but not perspective mapping  between these point sets, then the connecting lines of corresponding points form a non degenerate dual conic.

In order to generate elements of a dual parabola, one starts with
 three points  not on a line,
 divides the line sections  and  each into  equally spaced line segments and adds numbers as shown in the picture.
 Then the lines  are tangents of a parabola, hence elements of a dual parabola.
 The parabola is a Bezier curve of degree 2 with the control points .

The proof is a consequence of the de Casteljau algorithm for a Bezier curve of degree 2.

Inscribed angles and the 3-point form 

A parabola with equation  is uniquely determined by three points  with different x coordinates. The usual procedure to determine the coefficients  is to insert the point coordinates into the equation. The result is a linear system of three equations, which can be solved by Gaussian elimination or Cramer's rule, for example. An alternative way uses the inscribed angle theorem for parabolas.

In the following, the angle of two lines will be measured by the difference of the slopes of the line with respect to the directrix of the parabola. That is, for a parabola of equation  the angle between two lines of equations  is measured by 

Analogous to the inscribed angle theorem for circles, one has the inscribed angle theorem for parabolas:
That is,
 

(Proof: straightforward calculation: If the points are on a parabola, one may translate the coordinates for having the equation , then one has  if the points are on the parabola.)

A consequence is that the equation (in ) of the parabola determined by 3 points  with different  coordinates is (if two  coordinates are equal, there is no parabola with directrix parallel to the  axis, which passes through the points)
 
Multiplying by the denominators that depend on  one obtains the more standard form

Pole–polar relation 

In a suitable coordinate system any parabola can be described by an equation . The equation of the tangent at a point  is
 
One obtains the function
 
on the set of points of the parabola onto the set of tangents.

The inverse mapping is 
 line  → point .
This relation is called the pole–polar relation of the parabola, where the point is the pole, and the corresponding line its polar.

By calculation, one checks the following properties of the pole–polar relation of the parabola:
 For a point (pole) on the parabola, the polar is the tangent at this point.
 For a pole  outside the parabola the intersection points of its polar with the parabola are the touching points of the two tangents passing .
 For a point within the parabola the polar has no point with the parabola in common (see picture:  and ).
 The intersection point of two polar lines (for example) is the pole of the connecting line of their poles.
 Focus and directrix of the parabola are a pole–polar pair.

Remark: Pole–polar relations also exist for ellipses and hyperbolas.

Tangent properties

Two tangent properties related to the latus rectum 

Orthoptic property 

If two tangents to a parabola are perpendicular to each other, then they intersect on the directrix. Conversely, two tangents that intersect on the directrix are perpendicular. In other words, at any point on the directrix the whole parabola subtends a right angle.

Lambert's theorem 
Let three tangents to a parabola form a triangle. Then Lambert's theorem states that the focus of the parabola lies on the circumcircle of the triangle.

Tsukerman's converse to Lambert's theorem states that, given three lines that bound a triangle, if two of the lines are tangent to a parabola whose focus lies on the circumcircle of the triangle, then the third line is also tangent to the parabola.

Facts related to chords and arcs

Focal length calculated from parameters of a chord 
Suppose a chord crosses a parabola perpendicular to its axis of symmetry. Let the length of the chord between the points where it intersects the parabola be  and the distance from the vertex of the parabola to the chord, measured along the axis of symmetry, be . The focal length, of the parabola is given by

 

Proof
Suppose a system of Cartesian coordinates is used such that the vertex of the parabola is at the origin, and the axis of symmetry is the  axis. The parabola opens upward. Since this point is on the parabola, these coordinates must satisfy the equation above. Therefore, by substitution, . From this, .

Area enclosed between a parabola and a chord 

The area enclosed between a parabola and a chord (see diagram) is two-thirds of the area of a parallelogram that surrounds it. One side of the parallelogram is the chord, and the opposite side is a tangent to the parabola. The slope of the other parallel sides is irrelevant to the area. Often, as here, they are drawn parallel with the parabola's axis of symmetry, but this is arbitrary.

A theorem equivalent to this one, but different in details, was derived by Archimedes in the 3rd century BCE. He used the areas of triangles, rather than that of the parallelogram. See The Quadrature of the Parabola.

The area  of the parabolic segment enclosed by the parabola and the chord is therefore

 

This formula can be compared with the area of a triangle: .

In general, the enclosed area can be calculated as follows. First, locate the point on the parabola where its slope equals that of the chord. This can be done with calculus, or by using a line that is parallel to the axis of symmetry of the parabola and passes through the midpoint of the chord. The required point is where this line intersects the parabola. Then, using the formula given in Distance from a point to a line, calculate the perpendicular distance from this point to the chord. Multiply this by the length of the chord to get the area of the parallelogram, then by 2/3 to get the required enclosed area.

Corollary concerning midpoints and endpoints of chords 

A corollary of the above discussion is that if a parabola has several parallel chords, their midpoints all lie on a line parallel to the axis of symmetry. If tangents to the parabola are drawn through the endpoints of any of these chords, the two tangents intersect on this same line parallel to the axis of symmetry (see Axis-direction of a parabola).

Arc length 

This quantity  is the length of the arc between X and the vertex of the parabola.

The perpendicular distance  can be given a positive or negative sign to indicate on which side of the axis of symmetry X is situated. The calculation can be simplified by using the properties of logarithms:

 

This can be useful, for example, in calculating the size of the material needed to make a parabolic reflector or parabolic trough.

This calculation can be used for a parabola in any orientation. It is not restricted to the situation where the axis of symmetry is parallel to the y axis.

A geometrical construction to find a sector area 

S is the focus, and V is the principal vertex of the parabola VG. Draw VX perpendicular to SV.

Take any point B on VG and drop a perpendicular BQ from B to VX. Draw perpendicular ST intersecting BQ, extended if necessary, at T. At B draw the perpendicular BJ, intersecting VX at J.

For the parabola, the segment VBV, the area enclosed by the chord VB and the arc VB, is equal to ∆VBQ / 3, also .

The area of the parabolic sector SVB = ∆SVB + ∆VBQ / 3.

Since triangles TSB and QBJ are similar,

 

Therefore, the area of the parabolic sector  and can be found from the length of VJ, as found above.

A circle through S, V and B also passes through J.

Conversely, if a point, B on the parabola VG is to be found so that the area of the sector SVB is equal to a specified value, determine the point J on VX and construct a circle through S, V and J. Since SJ is the diameter, the center of the circle is at its midpoint, and it lies on the perpendicular bisector of SV, a distance of one half VJ from SV. The required point B is where this circle intersects the parabola.

If a body traces the path of the parabola due to an inverse square force directed towards S, the area SVB increases at a constant rate as point B moves forward. It follows that J moves at constant speed along VX as B moves along the parabola.

If the speed of the body at the vertex where it is moving perpendicularly to SV is v, then the speed of J is equal to 3v/4.

The construction can be extended simply to include the case where neither radius coincides with the axis SV as follows. Let A be a fixed point on VG between V and B, and point H be the intersection on VX with the perpendicular to SA at A. From the above, the area of the parabolic sector .

Conversely, if it is required to find the point B for a particular area SAB, find point J from HJ and point B as before. By Book 1, Proposition 16, Corollary 6 of Newton's Principia, the speed of a body moving along a parabola with a force directed towards the focus is inversely proportional to the square root of the radius.

The above construction was devised by Isaac Newton and can be found in Book 1 of Philosophiæ Naturalis Principia Mathematica as Proposition 30.

Focal length and radius of curvature at the vertex 
The focal length of a parabola is half of its radius of curvature at its vertex.

Proof

Consider a point  on a circle of radius  and with center at the point . The circle passes through the origin. If the point is near the origin, the Pythagorean theorem shows that

Therefore, extremely close to the origin

 (1)

Compare this with the parabola

 (2)

which has its vertex at the origin, opens upward, and has focal length  (see preceding sections of this article).

Equations (1) and (2) are equivalent if . Therefore, this is the condition for the circle and parabola to coincide at and extremely close to the origin. The radius of curvature at the origin, which is the vertex of the parabola, is twice the focal length.

 Corollary
A concave mirror that is a small segment of a sphere behaves approximately like a parabolic mirror, focusing parallel light to a point midway between the centre and the surface of the sphere.

As the affine image of the unit parabola 

Another definition of a parabola uses affine transformations:
 Any parabola is the affine image of the unit parabola with equation .

parametric representation
If  are the column vectors of the matrix , the unit parabola  is mapped onto the parabola

where
  is a point of the parabola,
  is a tangent vector at point ,
  is parallel to the axis of the parabola (axis of symmetry through the vertex).

vertex

Hence the parameter  of the vertex is the solution of the equation
 
which is
 
and the vertex is
 

focal length and focus
The focal length can be determined by a suitable parameter transformation (which does not change the geometric shape of the parabola). The focal length is
 
Hence the focus of the parabola is
 

implicit representation
.

parabola in space
The definition of a parabola in this section gives a parametric representation of an arbitrary parabola, even in space, if one allows  to be vectors in space.

As quadratic Bézier curve 

 

This curve is an arc of a parabola (see ).

Numerical integration 

In one method of numerical integration one replaces the graph of a function by arcs of parabolas and integrates the parabola arcs. A parabola is determined by three points. The formula for one arc is
 

The method is called Simpson's rule.

As plane section of quadric 
The following quadrics contain parabolas as plane sections:
 elliptical cone,
 parabolic cylinder,
 elliptical paraboloid,
 hyperbolic paraboloid,
 hyperboloid of one sheet,
 hyperboloid of two sheets.

As trisectrix 

A parabola can be used as a trisectrix, that is it allows the exact trisection of an arbitrary angle with straightedge and compass. This is not in contradiction to the impossibility of an angle trisection with compass-and-straightedge constructions alone, as the use of parabolas is not allowed in the classic rules for compass-and-straightedge constructions.

To trisect , place its leg  on the x axis such that the vertex  is in the coordinate system's origin. The coordinate system also contains the parabola . The unit circle with radius 1 around the origin intersects the angle's other leg , and from this point of intersection draw the perpendicular onto the y axis.

The triple-angle formula  then shows that  is indeed a solution of that cubic equation.

This trisection goes back to René Descartes, who described it in his book  (1637).

Generalizations 
If one replaces the real numbers by an arbitrary field, many geometric properties of the parabola  are still valid:
 A line intersects in at most two points. 
 At any point  the line  is the tangent.
Essentially new phenomena arise, if the field has characteristic 2 (that is): the tangents are all parallel.

In algebraic geometry, the parabola is generalized by the rational normal curves, which have coordinates ; the standard parabola is the case , and the case  is known as the twisted cubic. A further generalization is given by the Veronese variety, when there is more than one input variable.

In the theory of quadratic forms, the parabola is the graph of the quadratic form  (or other scalings), while the elliptic paraboloid is the graph of the positive-definite quadratic form  (or scalings), and the hyperbolic paraboloid is the graph of the indefinite quadratic form . Generalizations to more variables yield further such objects.

Negative fractional powers correspond to the implicit equation  and are traditionally referred to as higher hyperbolas. Analytically,  can also be raised to an irrational power (for positive values of ); the analytic properties are analogous to when  is raised to rational powers, but the resulting curve is no longer algebraic and cannot be analyzed by algebraic geometry.

In the physical world 
In nature, approximations of parabolas and paraboloids are found in many diverse situations. The best-known instance of the parabola in the history of physics is the trajectory of a particle or body in motion under the influence of a uniform gravitational field without air resistance (for instance, a ball flying through the air, neglecting air friction).

The parabolic trajectory of projectiles was discovered experimentally in the early 17th century by Galileo, who performed experiments with balls rolling on inclined planes. He also later proved this mathematically in his book Dialogue Concerning Two New Sciences. For objects extended in space, such as a diver jumping from a diving board, the object itself follows a complex motion as it rotates, but the center of mass of the object nevertheless moves along a parabola. As in all cases in the physical world, the trajectory is always an approximation of a parabola. The presence of air resistance, for example, always distorts the shape, although at low speeds, the shape is a good approximation of a parabola. At higher speeds, such as in ballistics, the shape is highly distorted and does not resemble a parabola.

Another hypothetical situation in which parabolas might arise, according to the theories of physics described in the 17th and 18th centuries by Sir Isaac Newton, is in two-body orbits, for example, the path of a small planetoid or other object under the influence of the gravitation of the Sun. Parabolic orbits do not occur in nature; simple orbits most commonly resemble hyperbolas or ellipses. The parabolic orbit is the degenerate intermediate case between those two types of ideal orbit. An object following a parabolic orbit would travel at the exact escape velocity of the object it orbits; objects in elliptical or hyperbolic orbits travel at less or greater than escape velocity, respectively. Long-period comets travel close to the Sun's escape velocity while they are moving through the inner Solar system, so their paths are nearly parabolic.

Approximations of parabolas are also found in the shape of the main cables on a simple suspension bridge. The curve of the chains of a suspension bridge is always an intermediate curve between a parabola and a catenary, but in practice the curve is generally nearer to a parabola due to the weight of the load (i.e. the road) being much larger than the cables themselves, and in calculations the second-degree polynomial formula of a parabola is used. Under the influence of a uniform load (such as a horizontal suspended deck), the otherwise catenary-shaped cable is deformed toward a parabola (see Catenary#Suspension bridge curve). Unlike an inelastic chain, a freely hanging spring of zero unstressed length takes the shape of a parabola. Suspension-bridge cables are, ideally, purely in tension, without having to carry other forces, for example, bending. Similarly, the structures of parabolic arches are purely in compression.

Paraboloids arise in several physical situations as well. The best-known instance is the parabolic reflector, which is a mirror or similar reflective device that concentrates light or other forms of electromagnetic radiation to a common focal point, or conversely, collimates light from a point source at the focus into a parallel beam. The principle of the parabolic reflector may have been discovered in the 3rd century BC by the geometer Archimedes, who, according to a dubious legend, constructed parabolic mirrors to defend Syracuse against the Roman fleet, by concentrating the sun's rays to set fire to the decks of the Roman ships. The principle was applied to telescopes in the 17th century. Today, paraboloid reflectors can be commonly observed throughout much of the world in microwave and satellite-dish receiving and transmitting antennas.

In parabolic microphones, a parabolic reflector is used to focus sound onto a microphone, giving it highly directional performance.

Paraboloids are also observed in the surface of a liquid confined to a container and rotated around the central axis. In this case, the centrifugal force causes the liquid to climb the walls of the container, forming a parabolic surface. This is the principle behind the liquid-mirror telescope.

Aircraft used to create a weightless state for purposes of experimentation, such as NASA's "Vomit Comet", follow a vertically parabolic trajectory for brief periods in order to trace the course of an object in free fall, which produces the same effect as zero gravity for most purposes.

Gallery

See also 
 Degenerate conic
 Parabolic dome
 Parabolic partial differential equation
 Quadratic equation
 Quadratic function
 Universal parabolic constant
 Confocal conic sections#Confocal parabolas

Footnotes

References

Further reading

External links 

 
 
 Interactive parabola-drag focus, see axis of symmetry, directrix, standard and vertex forms
 Archimedes Triangle and Squaring of Parabola at cut-the-knot
 Two Tangents to Parabola at cut-the-knot
 Parabola As Envelope of Straight Lines at cut-the-knot
 Parabolic Mirror at cut-the-knot
 Three Parabola Tangents at cut-the-knot
 Focal Properties of Parabola at cut-the-knot
 Parabola As Envelope II at cut-the-knot
 The similarity of parabola at Dynamic Geometry Sketches, interactive dynamic geometry sketch.
 Frans van Schooten: Mathematische Oeffeningen, 1659

 
Conic sections
Algebraic curves